A Letter from Home may refer to:

 "A Letter from Home", Don Rosa's sequel to The Crown of the Crusader Kings
 A Letter from Home (film), a 1941 short documentary film directed by Carol Reed

See also
Letter from Home (disambiguation)